The RH postcode area, also known as the Redhill postcode area, is a group of twenty postcode districts in South East England, within seventeen post towns. These cover east Surrey (including Redhill, Reigate, Betchworth, Dorking, Lingfield, Horley, Oxted and Godstone) and northeastern West Sussex (including Crawley, Gatwick, Haywards Heath, Billingshurst, East Grinstead, Burgess Hill, Horsham and Pulborough) plus small parts of northwestern East Sussex (including Forest Row).

The main sorting office is in Crawley (Gatwick Mail Centre), and the area served includes parts of the Surrey districts of Guildford, Mole Valley, Reigate and Banstead and Tandridge, as well as most of the West Sussex districts of Crawley, Horsham and Mid Sussex, and small parts of the East Sussex districts of Lewes and Wealden.



Coverage
The approximate coverage of the postcode districts:

|-
! RH1
| REDHILL
| Redhill, Merstham, Earlswood, South Earlswood, Whitebushes, Salfords, Nutfield, Nutfield Marsh, South Nutfield, Bletchingley, Outwood
| Reigate and Banstead, Tandridge
|-
! RH2
| REIGATE
| Reigate, Woodhatch, South Park, Skimmington, Leigh, Dawes Green, Bunce Common, Shellwood Cross, Nalderswood,  Sidlow,  Irons Bottom
| Reigate and Banstead, Mole Valley
|-
! RH3
| BETCHWORTH
| Betchworth, Brockham, Buckland, Strood Green, Gadbrook
| Mole Valley
|-
! RH4
| DORKING
| Dorking, Pixham, Westcott
| Mole Valley
|-
! RH5
| DORKING
| Abinger, Capel, Westhumble, Mickleham, Ockley, Holmbury St Mary, Beare Green
| Mole Valley, Guildford
|-
! rowspan="2"|RH6
| GATWICK
| Gatwick Airport
| Crawley
|-
| HORLEY
| Horley, Burstow, Smallfield
| Reigate and Banstead, Crawley, Mole Valley, Tandridge
|-
! RH7
| LINGFIELD
| Lingfield, Dormansland, Crowhurst
| Tandridge
|-
! RH8
| OXTED
| Oxted, Limpsfield, Limpsfield Chart, Hurst Green, Merle Common, Tandridge, Crowhurst Lane End
| Tandridge
|-
! RH9
| GODSTONE
| Godstone, South Godstone
| Tandridge
|-
! RH10
| CRAWLEY
| Copthorne, Crawley Down, Domewood, Furnace Green, Northgate, Maidenbower, Pound Hill, Rowfant, Southgate, Three Bridges, Tilgate
| Crawley, Mid Sussex
|-
! RH11
| CRAWLEY
| Bewbush, Broadfield, Gossops Green, Ifield, Langley Green, Lowfield Heath, Pease Pottage, Southgate West, West Green
| Crawley, Mid Sussex, Horsham
|-
! RH12
| HORSHAM 
| Horsham, Broadbridge Heath, Kilnwood Vale, Rusper, Rudgwick, Warnham
| Horsham
|-
! RH13
| HORSHAM
| Barns Green, Cowfold, Mannings Heath, Partridge Green, Slinfold, Southwater, West Grinstead, Coolham
| Horsham
|-
! RH14
| BILLINGSHURST
| Billingshurst, Ifold, Kirdford, Loxwood, Plaistow, Wisborough Green
| Chichester, Horsham
|-
! RH15
| BURGESS HILL
| Burgess Hill, Ditchling Common
| Mid Sussex, Lewes
|-
! RH16
| HAYWARDS HEATH
| Haywards Heath, Lindfield
| Mid Sussex
|-
! RH17
| HAYWARDS HEATH
| Ansty, Ardingly, Balcombe, Bolney, Chelwood Gate, Cuckfield, Danehill, Handcross, Hickstead, Horsted Keynes, Wivelsfield, Wivelsfield Green
| Mid Sussex, Lewes, Wealden
|-
! RH18
| FOREST ROW
| Forest Row
| Wealden
|-
! RH19
| EAST GRINSTEAD
| East Grinstead, Ashurst Wood, Dormans Park, Felbridge, Felcourt, Hammerwood, Sharpthorne, West Hoathly
| Mid Sussex, Tandridge
|-
! RH20
| PULBOROUGH
| Pulborough, Ashington, Storrington, West Chiltington, West Chiltington Common, Bury, Watersfield, Sutton, Fittleworth
| Chichester, Horsham
|-
! style="background:#FFFFFF;"|RH77
| style="background:#FFFFFF;"|REDHILL
| style="background:#FFFFFF;"|Jobcentre Plus
| style="background:#FFFFFF;"|non-geographic
|}

Map

See also
Postcode Address File
List of postcode areas in the United Kingdom

References

External links
Royal Mail's Postcode Address File
A quick introduction to Royal Mail's Postcode Address File (PAF)

Crawley
Postcode areas covering South East England